Tunari may refer to several places in Romania:

Tunari, a commune in Ilfov County
Tunari, a village in Bezdead Commune, Dâmbovița County
Tunari, a village in Botoroaga Commune, Teleorman County
Tunarii Noi and Tunarii Vechi, villages in Poiana Mare Commune, Dolj County

and to:

Tunari (Bolivia)